The International Museum of Horology, is a horological museum in La Chaux-de-Fonds, Switzerland. It is owned and operated by the city of La Chaux-de-Fonds.

History

In 1865 the Watchmaking School of La Chaux-de-Fonds had the idea of putting together a collection of old clocks, which was mainly used for didactic purposes. For 35 years, the clocks and watches in the collection were displayed solely for the use of students and teachers, until Maurice Picard, a watch-making industrialist and Jew of French origin, gave impetus to the idea of creating a museum. The town council was receptive to the idea, and on March 24th 1902, the town authorities signed the foundation deed of the Watchmaking Museum, originally located in the same building as the school. The collection gradually grew and the museum was enlarged three times, in 1907, 1952 and 1967.

It eventually became clear that the premises were no longer suitable for a permanent and functional display of the whole collection. The Committee of the Museum therefore suggested to the Municipality of La Chaux-de-Fonds that a foundation should be set up with the purpose of promoting the construction of a new building. Opened in 1974 under the name of Musée international d'horlogerie, this was characterized by a conception and techniques in the avant-garde of architecture and museography. 

Both Le Locle and its geographical twin town La Chaux-de-Fonds have now been recognised as an UNESCO World Heritage Site, for their horological and related cultural past.

References

 Baillod Gil, "The beating heart of worldwide horology", in watch around, n.012, automn 2011-winter 2012, pp. 70–73
 Bosshart, Nicole, "International Museum of Horology – La Chaux-de-Fonds", in BUJARD Jacques; TISSOT Laurent (2008), The Territory of Neuchâtel and its Horological Heritage. Chézard-Saint-Martin: Editions de la Chatière, pp. 351–354, . 

Horological museums in Switzerland
La Chaux-de-Fonds
Museums in the canton of Neuchâtel